Hymenocallis tridentata, the Florida spider-lily,  is a bulb-forming herb native to southern Florida, to about as far north as Vero Beach.  The species grows in marshes and wet prairies very close to sea level. It is similar to H. rotata, but somewhat smaller.

Hymenocallis tridentata is a bulb-forming perennial. Leaves are narrowly linear, up to 50 cm long, deep green. Scape is up to 30 cm tall, with an umbel of 2 flowers. Flowers are white, fragrant; stamanial cup up to 7 cm across, with uneven teeth along the edge.

References

External links
photo of herbarium specimen at Missouri Botanical Garden, holotype of Hymenocallis traubii, synonym of Hymenocallis tridentata

tridentata
Endemic flora of Florida
Plants described in 1933
Taxa named by John Kunkel Small
Flora without expected TNC conservation status